The 2011–12 Campionato Sammarinese di Calcio season was the twenty-seventh since its establishment. The season began with the first regular season games on 17 September 2011 and ended with the play-off final in May 2012. Tre Fiori are the defending league champions, having won their seventh Sammarinese championship and third-in-a-row last season. The title was won by S.P. Tre Penne.

Participating teams

Because there is no promotion or relegation in the league, the same 15 teams who competed in the league last season competed in the league this season.
 S.P. Cailungo (Borgo Maggiore)
 S.S. Cosmos (Serravalle)
 F.C. Domagnano (Domagnano)
 S.C. Faetano (Faetano)
 S.S. Folgore/Falciano (Serravalle)
 F.C. Fiorentino (Fiorentino)
 A.C. Juvenes/Dogana (Serravalle)
 S.S. Pennarossa (Chiesanuova)
 S.P. La Fiorita (Montegiardino)
 A.C. Libertas (Borgo Maggiore)
 S.S. Murata (San Marino)
 S.S. San Giovanni (Borgo Maggiore)
 S.P. Tre Fiori (Fiorentino)
 S.P. Tre Penne (Serravalle)
 S.S. Virtus (Acquaviva)

Venues
The teams do not have grounds of their own due to restricted space in San Marino. Each match was randomly assigned to one of the following grounds:
 Stadio Olimpico (Serravalle)
 Campo di Fiorentino (Fiorentino)
 Campo di Acquaviva (Chiesanuova)
 Campo di Dogana (Serravalle)
 Campo Fonte dell'Ovo (Domagnano)
 Campo di Serravalle "B" (Serravalle)

Regular season
The 15 clubs are split into two groups; one with eight clubs and another with seven clubs.

Group A

Group B

Results
All teams will play twice against the teams within their own group and once against the teams from the other group. This means that the clubs in the eight-club group will play 21 matches each while the clubs in the seven-club group will play 20 matches each during the regular season.

Play-off
The playoff was held in a double-eliminination format. Both group winners earned byes in the first and second round.

First round

Second round

La Fiorita were eliminated. They have qualified for the first qualifying round of the 2012–13 UEFA Europa League by winning the 2011–12 Coppa Titano.

Third round

Faetano were eliminated.

Fourth round

Cosmos were eliminated.

Semifinal

Final
The winner of the final will qualify for the first qualifying round of the 2012–13 UEFA Champions League, while the runner-up will qualify for the first qualifying round of the 2012–13 UEFA Europa League.

References 

Campionato Sammarinese di Calcio
San Marino
1